Caramel shortbread, also known as caramel squares, caramel slice, millionaire's shortbread, millionaire's slice, chocolate caramel shortbread, and Wellington squares is a biscuit confectionery item composed of a rectangular, triangular or  circular shortbread biscuit base topped with caramel and milk chocolate. Multiple variations exist which substitute or add ingredients to cater to different tastes, dietary requirements or ingredient availability.

History
Caramel shortbread is an adapted form of the original Scottish shortbread. Scottish shortbread originated around the 12th century, but its modern refined form is attributed to the efforts of Mary, Queen of Scots in the 16th century.
The practice of adding additional topping or ingredients to shortbread to create unique variations dates back to at least the 19th century when candied orange peel and almonds were added. Where and when the combination of caramel and shortbread first appeared or was popularised is not known. Combinations of shortbread with caramel topping dates to at least the early 1950s.

See also

 Twix
 Shortbread
 List of shortbread biscuits and cookies

References

Biscuits
Shortbread

Scottish cuisine
Australian cuisine
New Zealand cuisine
Australian desserts
Scottish desserts
New Zealand desserts